John Hudson may refer to:

Academics
 John Hudson (classicist) (1662–1719), English classical scholar
 John Hudson (historian), English medieval historian
 John Hudson (mathematician) (1773–1843), English mathematician and senior wrangler
 John Hudson (Shakespeare scholar)
 John Wilz Napier Hudson (1857–1936), ethnologist, husband of California artist Grace Hudson

Politics and military
 John Hudson (Indian Army officer) (1833–1893), British general
 John L. Hudson, U.S. Air Force general
 John T. Hudson (1811–1887), New York politician

Sports
 John Hudson (American football) (born 1968), American NFL football player
 John Hudson (basketball, born 1954), American former basketball player
 John Hudson (basketball, born 1966), American former basketball player
 John Hudson (cricketer) (1882–1961), Australian cricketer
 John Hudson (golfer) (born 1945), English golfer
 John Hudson (rower) (born 1940), Australian Olympic rower
 John Wilson Hudson, known as Johnny Hudson, baseball infielder
 Jack Hudson (English footballer) (John Hudson, 1860–1941), English footballer

Others
 John Hudson (actor) (1919–1996), older brother of actor William Hudson
 John Hudson (bishop) (1904–1981), Australian Anglican bishop
 John Hudson (journalist) (born 1956), New Zealand reporter
 John Hudson (theatre director) (born 1962), Canadian theatre producer and director, and politician in Alberta
 John Elbridge Hudson (1839–1900), U.S. lawyer, president of AT&T
 John Paul Hudson, American gay activist, writer, and actor
 John Pilkington Hudson (1910–2007), English horticultural scientist and bomb disposal expert

See also
 Jon Hudson (born 1968), musician in Faith No More
 Jack Hudson (disambiguation)
 Hudson (surname)
 Hudson (disambiguation)